Jacobstown is an unincorporated community located within North Hanover Township, in Burlington County, New Jersey, United States. Jacobstown got its name from a Quaker named Jacob Andrew. The community houses the North Hanover Township municipal building, courthouse, and two elementary schools within the North Hanover Township School District.

Notable people
People who were born in, residents of, or otherwise closely associated with Jacobstown include:
 Joe Borden (1854–1929), 19th century MLB pitcher.

References

North Hanover Township, New Jersey
Populated places in the Pine Barrens (New Jersey)
Unincorporated communities in Burlington County, New Jersey
Unincorporated communities in New Jersey